Fairmount, Cincinnati may refer to:

North Fairmount, Cincinnati
South Fairmount, Cincinnati